Athous sosybius is a species of click beetle (family  Elateridae) which is endemic to Dagestan.

References 

Beetles described in 1905
Beetles of Asia